Gordon Campbell Cameron (28 November 1937 – 14 March 1990) was a British economist and academic. He was Professor of Land Economy at the University of Cambridge from 1980 to 1990, and Master of Fitzwilliam College, Cambridge from 1988 to 1990.

Cameron read Politics and Economics at Durham University. He was the editor of Urban Studies (1969–1973), with his academic specialism being the economics of major cities in declining regions. Cameron, who founded the Centre for Urban and Regional Research at Glasgow University, served as an economic consultant to the Secretary of State for Scotland (1976–1980) before moving to Cambridge.

References

 

 
 
 

Academics of the University of Cambridge
Masters of Fitzwilliam College, Cambridge
1937 births
1990 deaths
20th-century British economists
Alumni of Hatfield College, Durham